The Paris Book of Customs is a Sefer Minhagim (book of religious customs) and the oldest illustrated Yiddish-language book. Completed in or before 1503, it consists of 121 folios, of which 94 are illustrated. The style of the illustrations and the language used indicates it was most likely created in Italy. Originally owned by a single family, presumably Ashkenazi immigrants from Germany or Austria, the book came into the possession of Cardinal Richelieu some time after 1632 and was stored at the Sorbonne before being moved to the Bibliothèque nationale de France, where it is currently stored as Ms. Héb 586.

Written in "clear, concise language", the book was intended for a middle class family as a reference work for religious practice. Illustrations include the arrest of Gedaliah, the stoning of Amalek and a celebration after Tisha B'Av. The text itself was largely copied from the Sefer HaMinhagim of Isaac Tyrnau.

References

Bibliography 
 
 

Ashkenazi Jewish culture in Italy
Ashkenazi Jewish culture in Paris
Bibliothèque nationale de France collections
Jewish medieval literature
Jews and Judaism in Paris
University of Paris
Yiddish culture in France
Yiddish-language literature